#AdamLive is a Swedish talk show presented by Adam Alsing which began broadcasting on 5 September 2011 on TV3.  The program is a newer version of Alsing's former talk show Adam which was broadcast on TV3 between 1993 and 1997. Co-hosts in the program's first season are Carin da Silva and Daniel Breitholtz.

References

External links
Official site

Swedish television talk shows
TV3 (Sweden) original programming
2011 Swedish television series debuts